The Sony Ericsson F305 is a GSM mobile phone created and developed by Sony Ericsson in the FUN SERIES (F series). It was first released in November 2008. It is especially designed for gamers, like the Sony Ericsson F500 which was released in 2004. The phone comes with 11 preinstalled games that can not be deleted, and an internet browser. It has since been succeeded by the Sony Ericsson Yari a year later.

Specifications
GSM 850 / 900 / 1800 / 1900
96 x 48 x 14.6 Screen Size
97.5 g
256K, 176 x 220 pixels, 2 inch LCD TFT screen
Polyphonic and MP3 ringtones
Speakerphone
1000 entries in Phone Book, Photo call
Call Records, 30 received, dialled and missed calls
10 MB Handset Memory
Memory Stick Micro (M2), up to 4 GB
Bluetooth, GPRS, USB 2.0
2-megapixel camera, 1600x1200 pixels
Video in 176x144p 15fps
Messaging, SMS, MMS, Email, Instant Messaging
WAP 2.0/xHTML Browser
Stereo FM radio with RDSbass walkman system 45bits
9 pre-installed games + another 50 on the memory card
Polar White & Mystic Black colours
Java MIDP 2.0
MP3 Player
TrackID music recognition
Picture editor/blogging
Organizer
Voice memo/dial
Li-ion Battery
Stand-by	Up to 400 hours
Talk time	Up to 8 hours

F305
Mobile phones introduced in 2008